Paul Brumer is a professor of chemistry at the University of Toronto in the field of chemical physics. He was elected a fellow of the American Physical Society in 1993 for "the development of quantum and classical dynamics of isolated molecules and the coherent control of chemical reactions."

Early life and education 
Brumer was born in the New York borough of Brooklyn. He graduated from Brooklyn College with a bachelor's degree in 1966. In 1972 he received his doctorate from Harvard University with the later chemistry Nobel Prize winner Martin Karplus with a thesis titled Structure and Collision Complex Dynamics of Alkali Halide Dimers. As a postdoctoral fellow, he worked with Raphael Levine and Alexander Dalgarno at the Harvard Center for Astrophysics, where he lectured on astronomy.

Career
In 1975 he moved to the Department of Chemistry at the University of Toronto. In his early scientific work, Brumer dealt with different aspects of the classical and quantum mechanical description of the dynamics of chemical reactions. With the increasing application of methods of nonlinear dynamics and especially chaos theory in physics in the early 1970s, he also recognized the potential of these concepts for theoretical chemistry early on. In addition to linking classic chaotic dynamics and statistical behavior in chemical reactions, he used theoretical methods to investigate the occurrence of quantum chaos with such reactions. He published his best-known and most-cited work with Moshe Shapiro and co-workers on the theory of laser control of chemical reactions, also known as coherent control of chemical reactions. This is the control of chemical reactions with coherent light with the goal of maximum reaction yield.

Honors and awards
In 1993 Brumer became an elected fellow of the American Physical Society. He was elected a fellow of the Royal Society of Canada in 1994. He received the Izaak Walton Killam Memorial Prize in 2000 for his work in chemical physics. He also is a fellow of the Royal Society of Canada.

Selected publications 
Textbooks
 
 

Articles

References

External links
Paul Brumer at Google Scholar

Year of birth missing (living people)
Living people
Brooklyn College alumni
Harvard University alumni
Academic staff of the University of Toronto
Fellows of the American Physical Society
American expatriates in Canada
American expatriate academics
21st-century American chemists
Fellows of the Royal Society of Canada
20th-century American chemists
Scientists from Brooklyn